The Finnish Geospatial Research Institute, formerly Finnish Geodetic Institute (FGI) is a research institute in Finland specializing in geodesy and geospatial information science and technology. It merged into the National Land Survey of Finland in 2015, when its name was changed. It is located in Masala, Kirkkonummi.

History
The FGI was founded in 1918. The institute creates and maintains national coordinate, height, and gravity systems. It also participates in projects that try to advance spatial data infrastructure and conducts research on geodynamics, advanced spatial data and remote sensing and photogrammetry. The institute also has a statutory responsibility to maintain the national standards of acceleration of free fall and geodetic length.

Organization
The FGI is currently divided into four departments:
Geodesy and Geodynamics
Geoinformatics and Cartography
Remote Sensing and Photogrammetry
Navigation and Positioning

External links
Finnish Geospatial Research Institute web page

Research institutes in Finland
Geodesy organizations